is an action-adventure game developed and published by Nintendo for the Game Boy. The first Metroid game for a handheld game console, it was released in North America in November 1991 and in Japan and Europe in 1992. The game follows bounty hunter Samus Aran on her mission to eradicate the Metroids from their home planet, SR388, before the Space Pirates can obtain them. Players must find and exterminate the Metroids to progress.

Like the original Metroid released in 1986 for the Nintendo Entertainment System, Metroid II was developed by Nintendo Research & Development 1 and produced by Gunpei Yokoi. The game introduced several features that became staples of the series, including Samus's round-shouldered Varia Suit, Space Jump, Spazer Beam and Spider Ball.

Metroid II received positive reviews, with praise for its story, setting, and improved gameplay, but was criticized for its graphics and audio. By late 2003, it had sold 1.72 million copies worldwide. It was rereleased on the Nintendo 3DS Virtual Console service in 2011 and on the Nintendo Switch Online service in February 2023. A sequel, Super Metroid, was released for the Super Nintendo Entertainment System in 1994. A remake of Metroid II, Metroid: Samus Returns, was released for the Nintendo 3DS in 2017.

Gameplay

Metroid II is an action-adventure side-scroller game in which the player controls the protagonist Samus Aran on the fictional planet SR388. Players advance through the game by using Samus' weapons to kill a fixed number (47) of Metroid creatures. The player is given a detector that displays the number of Metroids remaining in the area. Once all the creatures are eliminated, an earthquake occurs and the planet's lava levels decrease, allowing Samus to travel deeper through its tunnels. The Metroid creatures are encountered in different evolution stages of their development cycle: original, Alpha, Gamma, Zeta and Omega. The more developed the organism is, the stronger its attack. Metroid II features save modules located around the planet, which allow players to save their progress and continue in another session.

The game features two weapons new to the Metroid series: the tri-splitting Spazer Laser Beam, and the Plasma Beam, which passes through enemies when shot. Samus can only equip one beam at a time; however, she can switch between them by returning to where they are first found. Metroid II features the Space Jump, a new suit enhancement that allows Samus to jump infinitely and access otherwise unreachable areas. The game also sees the return of Samus' Morph Ball, a mode in which she curls up into a ball to travel through small tunnels. In addition, the game is the first in the series to feature the Spider Ball and Spring Ball. The Spider Ball allows Samus to climb most walls or ceilings, giving her freedom to explore both the surfaces and ceilings of caverns, and the Spring Ball gives Samus the ability to jump while curled up into a ball in the Morph Ball form.

Plot

In the events of the first Metroid, bounty hunter Samus Aran foiled the Space Pirates' plans to use the newly discovered lifeform known as Metroids. Some time later, the Galactic Federation, concerned by the events that transpired, resolved to ensure that the Metroids' power could never again be used by the Pirates, and sent several teams to the Metroid's home planet SR388 to destroy the species once and for all. However, when each of the teams disappear, the Galactic Federation contracts Samus to finish the mission.

While exploring the planet, Samus encounters Metroids and destroys them, slowly decreasing the planet's Metroid population. During her mission, she notices the mutations that each creature exhibits: the Metroids grow from small jellyfish-like creatures into large, hovering, lizard-like beasts. After destroying most of the planet's Metroids, Samus kills the Queen Metroid.

Samus proceeds to return to her gunship through the planet's tunnels. Along the way, she finds a Metroid egg. A Metroid hatchling floats out of the broken shell and imprints onto Samus, thinking that she is its mother. Unable to commit to her mission of extermination, Samus spares its life. She exits the tunnels while the Metroid helps clear the way. Reaching the planet's surface, Samus and the infant Metroid board the gunship together.

Development

Metroid II was developed by Nintendo Research & Development 1 (Nintendo R&D1), and produced by Gunpei Yokoi; they both also worked on the previous Metroid game for the Nintendo Entertainment System. It was directed by Hiroji Kiyotake and Hiroyuki Kimura, and designed by Makoto Kano, while Takahiro Harada serving as the main programmer. Metroid II marked a "new high point" for handheld game consoles, with graphics that were almost as good as the 8-bit graphics in games for the NES. The game features enhancements from its predecessor that include easier controls which allow Samus to crouch while firing at the same time, and jump while shooting straight down to attack anything below her. The game utilizes the cartridge's battery-backed memory for saving the player's progress. In the 2004 interview for the Nintendo Dream magazine, Kiyotake revealed that the planet SR388 was named after the Yamaha SR400 motorcycle.

The Game Boy's black-and-white graphics resulted in changes to Samus's gear that eventually became permanent. In the original Metroid, color was used to differentiate between Samus's Power Suit and her Varia Suitan upgraded version. However, without color on the Game Boy, the two suits would have appeared similar, requiring the developers to develop a visual indicator for players to determine which suit Samus is wearing. They also updated her Varia Suit, adding round metal shoulders that have been a part of the suit in every game in the series since then. Nintendo R&D1 was involved in developing the Game Boy Color, a successor to the original Game Boy with a color screen. Nintendo of America's Dan Owsen noted that Nintendo R&D1 included a special "Metroid palette" in the Game Boy Color's hardware, which "makes Metroid II look really, really nice on Game Boy Color", remarking that this made the game's graphics comparable to the original Metroid on the Nintendo Entertainment System.

Release
Metroid II was released in North America in November 1991. This was followed by the release in Japan on January 21, 1992, and in Europe on May 21. It has shipped 1.72 million copies worldwide by late 2003. Nintendo included the game in its Player's Choice marketing label in North America in 1993. It was re-released through the Nintendo Power service in Japan on March 1, 2000. Metroid II, along with other Game Boy games such as Super Mario Land 2: 6 Golden Coins, Mega Man: Dr. Wily's Revenge, and several others were released on the Nintendo 3DS Virtual Console service in 2011. It was released in Japan on September 28, and in North America and Europe on November 24.

Remakes

An unofficial fangame remake of Metroid II, AM2R, short for Another Metroid 2 Remake (the name being a reference to all of the other Metroid II remakes being produced at the time), was developed by Milton Guasti, under the pseudonym DoctorM64. AM2R updates the game's appearance by drawing upon the visual designs of Super Metroid, and features gameplay modeled after Metroid: Zero Mission. It includes elements such as a map system, minibosses, stackable beams, and a log system with non-intrusive narrative. After years of development, AM2R was released in August 2016 for Windows, coinciding with the thirtieth anniversary of the Metroid series. Shortly after the game's release, the download links on AM2R official website were removed after Nintendo sent DMCA notices to websites hosting it, although Guasti said that he still planned to continue working on the game privately. In September, the game's development ended after Guasti received a DMCA takedown request from Nintendo. Several journalists have enjoyed AM2R, frequently calling it impressive and commenting on the improved visuals compared to those of Metroid II.

An official remake of Metroid II, Metroid: Samus Returns, was developed by Nintendo and MercurySteam and released for the Nintendo 3DS on September 15, 2017.

Reception

Although considered by a few critics to be the weakest game in the franchise and not as well received as the Nintendo Entertainment System counterpart, Metroid II still received generally favorable reviews. Upon the game's release, Japanese gaming magazine Famitsu gave it a 25 out of 40 score. Because Metroid II has a single large level instead of multiple small ones, Tim Jones of IGN found the game a "refreshing departure from the norm", which made him feel claustrophobic the further into the game he ventured. He praised Metroid IIs replay value, considering its non-linearity as the primary reason for this. In their retrospective video on the Metroid series, GameTrailers believed that the game still maintained the high standards set by its predecessor and noted that it also introduced new methods of exploration to the series that have become staples.

Marcel Van Duyn of Nintendo Life writes that Metroid II "expands on the original title quite nicely", and noted that the difficulty was improved over the original Metroid because of the inclusion of "hot spots" that restores health and missiles. On the other hand, Jeremy Parish of 1UP.com was particularly critical of Metroid II, finding the game painful to play and describing it as "something of a dark spot on a brilliant series' reputation". However, Parish found the game's premise "ambitious", adding that it provided the series a vital crux, as Samus' actions in Metroid II set the plot for Super Metroid and Metroid Fusion. GameTrailers similarly commented that it told one of the most pivotal chapters in the series' overall plot.

Van Duyn praised Metroid II visual detail, writing that the foregrounds and the enemies are detailed so players can identify them easily. Jones considered the graphics average, and noted that the walls appeared mostly the same, which confuses players when wandering through identical tunnels. Aside from Samus, Parish complained of the visuals, describing the environment as bland and repetitive, full of monotonous rocks and sand with few details to differentiate the various areas, and enemies as simple and boxy. Parish also found the music "downright painful", which he contrasted with the "moody, atmospheric compositions" the series was known for. Van Duyn similarly commented that the music is the only negative point in the game, and said that the ambient sounds tend to get annoying after hearing them frequently. In contrast, Jones highlighted the music positively, stating that the lack of aesthetic detail boosts the game's distinctive atmosphere, and the music playing at the right times. Jones was also pleased with its sound effects.

In September of 1997, 12 Nintendo Power staff members voted in a list for the top 100 games of all time. The magazine placed Metroid II at 34th place on their list of top 100 games of all time. In their Top 200 Games list, Nintendo Power also ranked the game as the 85th best game on a Nintendo console, and Videogames.com included it in their list of the best Game Boy games. Nintendo Power listed it as the 12th-best Game Boy/Game Boy Color video game, praising it for introducing several staple abilities to the series. Game Informers Ben Reeves called it the ninth best Game Boy game and noted that it polarized fans.

Sequel

Super Metroid, the third installment of the Metroid series, was released for the Super Nintendo Entertainment System in 1994. The game's story takes place after the events of Metroid II, and follows Samus as she travels to planet Zebes in an attempt to retrieve an infant Metroid stolen by Ridley. Metroid director Yoshio Sakamoto said at the 2010 Game Developers Conference that he was "very moved" by the ending of Metroid II, which motivated him to create Super Metroid.

Notes

References

External links 
 Official Nintendo Japan Metroid II: Return of Samus website 
 Metroid II at IGN
 Metroid II at the Metroid Database

1991 video games
Action-adventure games
Extinction in fiction
Game Boy games
Metroid games
Metroidvania games
Nintendo Switch Online games
Science fiction video games
Side-scrolling video games
Single-player video games
Video games developed in Japan
Video games featuring female protagonists
Video games produced by Gunpei Yokoi
Video games set on fictional planets
Video games set in outer space
Virtual Console games
Virtual Console games for Nintendo 3DS